Lewis Smith (May 11, 1880 – January 1, 1950) was a Canadian politician. He served in the Legislative Assembly of New Brunswick as member of the Conservative party representing Albert County from 1917 to 1930 and Westmorland County from 1930 to 1935.

References

20th-century Canadian politicians
1880 births
1950 deaths
Progressive Conservative Party of New Brunswick MLAs
People from Albert County, New Brunswick